This is a list of earthquakes in 1936. Only magnitude 6.0 or greater earthquakes appear on the list. Lower magnitude events are included if they have caused death, injury or damage. Events which occurred in remote areas will be excluded from the list as they wouldn't have generated significant media interest. All dates are listed according to UTC time. Dutch East Indies and China in particular had the main bulk of the activity in this year. Dutch East Indies saw five of the 13 magnitude 7.0+ events. China on the other hand had six earthquakes which resulted in substantial numbers of deaths during the year.

Overall

By death toll 

 Note: At least 10 casualties

By magnitude 

 Note: At least 7.0 magnitude

Notable events

January

February

March

April

May

June

July

August

September

October

November

December

References

1936
 
1936